Hawd Region was a region in Somaliland. The Hawd Region was created by President Dahir Riyale Kahin on May 15, 2008. 

It sits at a DMS latitude of 8° 0 min 0 sec and a DMS longitude of 46° 30 min 0 sec. Its capital is the town of Baligubadle.

The Haud is primarily inhabited by the Isaaq clan-family, most notably the Garhajis, Habr Awal, Habr Je'lo and Arap clans, and is part of the wider clan-family's core traditional territory. Several subclans of the Darod clan are also present in the region, most notably the Ogaden, Jidwaaq, Dhulbahante and Majerten subclans.

See also
Administrative divisions of Somaliland
Regions of Somaliland
Districts of Somaliland
Somalia–Somaliland border

Notes

Geography of Somaliland